Melicope elleryana, commonly known as pink flowered doughwood, pink evodia, corkwood, or saruwa, is a species of rainforest shrub or tree in the family Rutaceae, and is native to New Guinea, parts of eastern Indonesia, the Solomon Islands and northern Australia. It has trifoliate leaves and pink to white, bisexual flowers arranged in panicles in leaf axils.

Description
The bark is pale brown and corky, especially at the base of the trunk.

Taxonomy
Pink-flowered doughwood was first formally described in 1865 by Ferdinand von Mueller who gave it the name Euodia elleryana and published the description in Fragmenta phytographiae Australiae from specimens collected by Anthelme Thozet near Beddome Creek (near Rockhampton). In 1990, Thomas Gordon Hartley changed the name to Melicope elleryana in the journal Telopea. The specific epithet (elleryana) honours the Victorian government astronomer, Robert L. J. Ellery.

Habitat and distribution
It occurs from the Maluku Islands east to the Solomon Islands and south to New Guinea and northern Australia. In Australia it is found in the far north-east of Western Australia, the Top End of the Northern Territory, northern and eastern Queensland and south to the Clarence River in northern New South Wales.

Ecology
This tree is the favoured food plant for the Ulysses butterfly, Papilio ulysses. Germination is unpredictable, starting within 30 days or possibly taking several years. Soaking the seeds for several days appears to remove some of the germination inhibitors.

Uses
This species is often cultivated as an ornamental tree. In New Guinea it is said to be used to flavour palm wine and an exudate from the bark is used as an adhesive, for caulking canoes and as a wound treatment.

References

External links
 
 View a map of historical sightings of this species at the Australasian Virtual Herbarium
 View observations of this species on iNaturalist
 View images of this species on Flickriver

elleryana
Sapindales of Australia
Flora of New South Wales
Flora of Queensland
Flora of Papua New Guinea
Flora of Western Australia
Flora of the Solomon Islands (archipelago)
Flora of the Maluku Islands
Plants described in 1865
Taxa named by Ferdinand von Mueller